The 8th New Brunswick Legislative Assembly represented New Brunswick between January 30, 1821, and 1827.

The assembly sat at the pleasure of the Lieutenant Governor of New Brunswick George S. Smyth. Howard Douglas became lieutenant governor in 1824.

The speaker of the house was selected as William Botsford. In 1824, after Botsford was appointed a judge, Ward Chipman, Jr. was elected speaker. Harry Peters succeeded Chipman as speaker in 1826.

History

Members 

Notes:

References 
Journal of the House of Assembly of the province of New-Brunswick from ... January to ... March, 1821 (1821)

08
1821 in Canada
1822 in Canada
1823 in Canada
1824 in Canada
1825 in Canada
1826 in Canada
1827 in Canada
1821 establishments in New Brunswick
1827 disestablishments in New Brunswick